Guido van Rossum (born 31 January 1956) is a Dutch programmer best known as the creator of the Python programming language, for which he was the "benevolent dictator for life" (BDFL) until he stepped down from the position on 12 July 2018. He remained a member of the Python Steering Council through 2019, and withdrew from nominations for the 2020 election.

Life and education
Van Rossum was born and raised in the Netherlands, where he received a master's degree in mathematics and computer science from the University of Amsterdam in 1982. He received a bronze medal in 1974 in the International Mathematical Olympiad. He has a brother, Just van Rossum, who is a type designer and programmer who designed the typeface used in the "Python Powered" logo.

Van Rossum lives in Belmont, California, with his wife, Kim Knapp, and their son. According to his home page and Dutch naming conventions, the "van" in his name is capitalized when he is referred to by surname alone, but not when using his first and last name together.

Work

Centrum Wiskunde & Informatica
While working at the Centrum Wiskunde & Informatica (CWI), Van Rossum wrote and contributed a glob() routine to BSD Unix in 1986 and helped develop the ABC programming language. He once stated, "I try to mention ABC's influence because I'm indebted to everything I learned during that project and to the people who worked on it." He also created Grail, an early web browser written in Python, and engaged in discussions about the HTML standard.

He has worked for various research institutes, including the Centrum Wiskunde & Informatica (CWI) in the Netherlands, the U.S. National Institute of Standards and Technology (NIST), and the Corporation for National Research Initiatives (CNRI). In May 2000, he left CNRI along with three other Python core developers to work for tech startup BeOpen.com, which subsequently collapsed by October of the same year. From late 2000 until 2003 he worked for Zope Corporation. In 2003 Van Rossum left Zope for Elemental Security. While there he worked on a custom programming language for the organization.

Google
From 2005 to December 2012, he worked at Google, where he spent half of his time developing the Python language. 
At Google, Van Rossum developed Mondrian, a web-based code review system written in Python and used within the company. He named the software after the Dutch painter Piet Mondrian. He named another related software project after Gerrit Rietveld, a Dutch designer. On 7 December 2012, Van Rossum left Google.

Dropbox

In January 2013, Van Rossum started working at the cloud file storage company Dropbox.

In October 2019, Van Rossum left Dropbox and officially retired.

Microsoft

On 12 November 2020 Van Rossum announced that he was coming out of retirement to join the Developer Division at Microsoft. He currently holds the title Distinguished Engineer at Microsoft.

Python
In December 1989, Van Rossum had been looking for a hobby' programming project that would keep [him] occupied during the week around Christmas" as his office was closed when he decided to write an interpreter for a "new scripting language [he] had been thinking about lately: a descendant of ABC that would appeal to Unix/C hackers". He attributes choosing the name "Python" to "being in a slightly irreverent mood (and a big fan of Monty Python's Flying Circus)".

He has explained that Python's predecessor, ABC, was inspired by SETL, noting that ABC co-developer Lambert Meertens had "spent a year with the SETL group at NYU before coming up with the final ABC design".

On 12 July 2018, Van Rossum announced that he would be stepping down from the position of BDFL of the Python programming language.

"Computer Programming for Everybody" proposal
In 1999, Van Rossum submitted a funding proposal to DARPA called "Computer Programming for Everybody", in which he further defined his goals for Python:
 An easy and intuitive language just as powerful as major competitors
 Open source, so anyone can contribute to its development
 Code that is as understandable as plain English
 Suitability for everyday tasks, allowing for short development times

In 2019, Python became the second most popular language on GitHub, the largest source code management website on the internet, second only to JavaScript. According to a programming language popularity survey it is consistently among the top 10 most mentioned languages in job postings. Furthermore, Python has been among the 10 most popular programming languages every year since 2004 according to the TIOBE Programming Community Index and got the number one spot on the index in October 2021.

Awards
 At the 2002 FOSDEM conference in Brussels, Van Rossum received the 2001 Award for the Advancement of Free Software from the Free Software Foundation (FSF) for his work on Python.
 In May 2003, he received a NLUUG Award.
 In 2006, he was recognized as a Distinguished Engineer by the Association for Computing Machinery.
 In 2018, he was made a Fellow of the Computer History museum.
 In 2019, he was awarded the honorary title of Dijkstra Fellow by CWI.

References

External links

 
 Guido van Rossum. The History of Python 
 Guido van Rossum. Neopythonic: Ramblings 
 Computer Programming for Everybody
 Guido van Rossum Interview on FLOSS Weekly
 Guido van Rossum interview - Workspiration.org
 Guido van Rossum on Python Interview - Computerworld
 Guido van Rossum Run your web applications on Google's infrastructure — Google App Engine technical talk at Stanford University. (video archive)
  Computer History Museum
  Computer History Museum

1956 births
Computer programmers
Dutch computer programmers
Dutch computer scientists
Dutch emigrants to the United States
Free software programmers
Google employees
Living people
Members of the Open Source Initiative board of directors
Microsoft employees
People from Belmont, California
People from Haarlem
Programming language designers
Python (programming language) people
University of Amsterdam alumni
Dutch software engineers